Cieux is a commune in the Haute-Vienne department of the Nouvelle-Aquitaine region in western France.

Inhabitants are known as Ciellois.

See also
 Communes of the Haute-Vienne department

References

Communes of Haute-Vienne